Aitor Osa Eizaguirre (born September 9, 1973) is a Spanish former road bicycle racer. He is an older brother of Unai Osa. He was involved in the Operación Puerto doping case.

Major results

1996
 6th Overall Vuelta a La Rioja
 9th GP Villafranca de Ordizia
1997
 4th Overall Vuelta a los Valles Mineros
 6th Subida al Naranco
 7th GP Villafranca de Ordizia
1998
 3rd Subida al Naranco
1999
 7th Overall Vuelta a Burgos
 7th Subida a Urkiola
2000
 2nd Overall Vuelta a Castilla y León
 3rd Overall G.P. Portugal Telecom
1st Stage 3
 6th Overall Tour of the Basque Country
 6th Klasika Primavera
 9th Overall Critérium International
2001
 5th Subida al Naranco
 9th Overall Vuelta a España
2002
 1st  Overall Tour of the Basque Country
1st Stage 3
 1st  Mountains classification Vuelta a España
 1st Stage 2 Vuelta a La Rioja
 1st Stage 4 Volta a Portugal
 2nd Subida al Naranco
 3rd Overall Vuelta a Aragón
 5th Gran Premio Miguel Induráin
2003
 2nd La Flèche Wallonne
 4th Klasika Primavera
 6th Overall Tour of the Basque Country
2004
 1st  Mountains classification Paris–Nice
 5th Overall Vuelta a Andalucía
 6th Circuito de Getxo
 9th Overall Setmana Catalana de Ciclisme
2005
 3rd Klasika Primavera
 4th Overall Tour of the Basque Country
 8th Overall Vuelta a Burgos
 8th La Flèche Wallonne
2006
 7th Gran Premio Miguel Induráin

See also
 List of doping cases in cycling

External links

1973 births
Cyclists from the Basque Country (autonomous community)
Spanish male cyclists
Living people
Doping cases in cycling
People from Urola Kosta
Sportspeople from Gipuzkoa